USS Marold (SP-737) was a United States Navy patrol vessel in commission from 1917 to 1919.

High speed motor yacht
Marold was built as a private, high speed motor yacht for Childe Harold Wills by the Matthews Boat Company, Port Clinton, Ohio, in 1914. The name is a compound of the owners given names, Mabel and Harold.

The engines were arranged with one being forward of a pair with controls between the two engines. Gasoline engines were considered expensive to operate with the note that at full speed the engines would use 95 gallons and at ten cents a gallon an hour's operation would cost $9.50 plus lube oil. The fuel capacity was  giving about thirty hours of full speed operation.

Wills was an avid racer, member of the Detroit Boat Club and Detroit Yacht Club, with several motor speedboats and one hydroplane, Baby Marold, to which Marold would be tender as well as a racer in itself. Though speed was the primary design factor Wills intended to use the yacht for cruising including ocean cruising to Florida and the Bahamas. The yacht had crew accommodation forward, a dining saloon and galley, a lounge that could be converted into two single staterooms aft and bathroom adjoining the owner's stateroom. On registration Marold was assigned the official number 213511 and signal letters LDNK with home port of Detroit.

Two years after launch Marold underwent overhaul at Matthews with modifications for replacement of the three original engines with four eight cylinder Van Blerck engines to likely become the fastest express cruiser on the Great Lakes and perhaps in the nation. About May 1917 the yacht was purchased by Louis K. Liggett of Chestnut Hill, Pennsylvania, founder of Rexall and later chairman of United Drug Company, who brought the yacht to Boston from Detroit by way of the Erie Canal and the Hudson River. On 3 June 1917 Liggett turned the yacht over to the government for use in the First Naval District.

Navy acquisition
The U.S. Navy acquired Marold under a free lease from Liggett for use as a section patrol vessel during World War I. She was commissioned as USS Marold (SP-737) on 2 June 1917.

Assigned to the 1st Naval District in northern New England and based at Rockland, Maine, Marold carried out patrol duties for the rest of World War I. Marold was returned to Liggett on 9 May 1919.

Footnotes

References

External links
NavSource Online: Section Patrol Craft Photo Archive Marold (SP 737)

Patrol vessels of the United States Navy
World War I patrol vessels of the United States
Ships built in Port Clinton, Ohio
1914 ships